Sociedad Deportiva Beasain is a Spanish football team based in Beasain, in the autonomous community of Basque Country. Founded in 1905 it plays in Segunda División RFEF – Group 2, holding home games at Estadio Loinaz, with a capacity of 6,000 seats.

Season to season

10 seasons in Segunda División B
1 season in Segunda División RFEF
29 seasons in Tercera División
1 season in Tercera División RFEF

Famous managers
 Perico Alonso

References

External links

Football clubs in the Basque Country (autonomous community)
Association football clubs established in 1905
1905 establishments in Spain
Sport in Gipuzkoa